Yealand Conyers is a civil parish in Lancaster, Lancashire, England. It contains 28 buildings that are recorded in the National Heritage List for England as designated listed buildings.  Of these, two are at Grade II*, the middle grade, and the others are at Grade II, the lowest grade.  The parish contains the village of Yealand Conyers, and is otherwise rural.  Most of the listed buildings are houses within the village.  The other listed buildings include a country house, two churches,  and a Quaker Meeting House.  The Lancaster Canal passes through the edge of the parish, and a bridge crossing it is listed.

Key

Buildings

Notes and references

Notes

Citations

Sources

Lists of listed buildings in Lancashire
Buildings and structures in the City of Lancaster